James Hutchinson may refer to:

 James Hutchinson (physician)
James Hutchinson (VC) (1895–1972), British recipient of the Victoria Cross
 James S. Hutchinson (1867–1959), explorer of the Sierra Nevada, California, USA
 James F. Hutchinson (born 1932), painter in Florida, U.S.A.
 Jim Hutchinson (1896–2000), English cricketer who lived to 103
 Jimmy Hutchinson (1915–1997), English footballer
 James Hutchinson (musician) (born 1953), American bassist
 James Hutchinson (priest) (1733–1813), Anglican priest in Ireland

See also
James Hutchison (disambiguation)